Lee Hyun-joo (born February 5, 1998), is a South Korean actress, singer and model. She is a former member of girl group April. Following her departure from the group, she participated in the KBS2's survival show The Unit and finished in fifth place, making her debut as a member of project girl group Uni.T in 2018. She is known for her lead roles in Love Distance 2, The Witch Store and Love, Can You Deliver Today.

Career

2015–2016: April and acting career

Lee Hyun-joo debuted as a member of April with the debut album Dreaming. After their second album Spring, she went on hiatus to focus on her health, and by October, she had announced her withdrawal from her group to pursue an acting career while dealing with her health issues.

In 2016, she made her acting debut with the starring television series Momin’s Room as the role of Lee Moda.

2017–present: The Unit, UNI.T and return to acting

In 2017, she joined the reality television survival series The Unit, and on May 18, 2018, she won 5th place, securing her spot in the temporary girl group, Uni.T with the group's debut EP Line.

On October 12, 2018, Uni.T disbanded after five months of promoting. Lee subsequently continued as an actress and returned to her agency.

Endorsements
On July 29, 2021, Hyun-Joo was selected as the new model for cosmetic brand LOAR.

Discography

Filmography

Television

Variety Show

References

External links 
 

Living people
People from Seoul
Actresses from Seoul
Singers from Seoul
DSP Media artists
21st-century South Korean actresses
South Korean female models
South Korean television actresses
1998 births
South Korean women singers
South Korean female idols
K-pop singers
April (girl group) members